Janne Nikodemus Kanerva (born  in Kankaanpää) is a Finnish male weightlifter, competing in the 105 kg category and representing Finland at international competitions. He participated at the 1992 Summer Olympics in the 90 kg event and at the 1996 Summer Olympics in the 108 kg event. He competed at world championships, most recently at the 1998 World Weightlifting Championships.

Major results

References

External links
 

1970 births
Living people
Finnish male weightlifters
Weightlifters at the 1992 Summer Olympics
Weightlifters at the 1996 Summer Olympics
Olympic weightlifters of Finland
People from Kankaanpää
Sportspeople from Satakunta
20th-century Finnish people
21st-century Finnish people